Breach was an action role-playing game developed by American studio QC Games, a former studio of ex-BioWare and EA Games developers. The game was released on Steam Early Access on January 17, 2018, but its development was cancelled entirely on April 3, 2019, along with the closure of the studio itself. The game received mixed reviews from critics.

Plot 
The story of Breach involves a group of "modern-day mages" who attempt to prevent a magical apocalypse when monsters of legend emerge from portals known as "breaches".

Gameplay 
The gameplay of Breach is "a hybrid of dungeon crawling and Devil May Cry" with an "MMO-lite structure". The game is 4v1 asymmetrical multiplayer in which four players attempt to get through a dungeon while a fifth controls a "Veil Demon" that can possess enemies, traps and boss monsters inside the dungeon. It had 18 playable classes.

Development 
The concept for Breach initially came from Shadow Realms, a planned BioWare Austin game that was unveiled in 2014 but cancelled by EA due to a "change in strategy" away from free-to-play games. Breach initially had an upfront cost, but was planned to eventually be free-to-play, though the game's designer stated that it would not be "pay to win". QC Games announced it was closing on April 3, 2019, ostensibly due to lack of funding, though they did not cite a specific reason for the shutdown.

Reception 
Breach garnered mixed reviews on Steam, with detractors citing crashes and framerate problems that resulted in the game being a "laggy mess", as well as the game's microtransaction system.

References 

2018 video games
Early access video games
Action role-playing video games
Windows games
Windows-only games
Asymmetrical multiplayer video games
Inactive multiplayer online games
Cancelled Windows games
Indie video games
Video games developed in the United States